The Internet Engineering Task Force (IETF) is a standards organization for the Internet and is responsible for the technical standards that make up the Internet protocol suite (TCP/IP). It has no formal membership roster or requirements and all its participants are volunteers. Their work is usually funded by employers or other sponsors.

The IETF was initially supported by the federal government of the United States but since 1993 has operated under the auspices of the Internet Society, an international non-profit  organization.

Organization
The IETF is organized into a large number of working groups and birds of a feather informal discussion groups, each dealing with a specific topic. The IETF operates in a bottom-up task creation mode, largely driven by these working groups. Each working group has an appointed chairperson (or sometimes several co-chairs); a charter that describes its focus; and what it is expected to produce, and when. It is open to all who want to participate and holds discussions on an open mailing list or at IETF meetings, where the entry fee in July 2014 was US$650 per person. As of mid-2018 the fees are: early bird $700, late payment $875, student $150 and a one-day pass for $375.

Rough consensus is the primary basis for decision making. There are no formal voting procedures. Because the majority of the IETF's work is done via mailing lists, meeting attendance is not required for contributors. Each working group is intended to complete work on its topic and then disband. In some cases, the working group will instead have its charter updated to take on new tasks as appropriate.

The working groups are organized into areas by subject matter. The current areas are Applications, General, Internet, Operations and Management, Real-time Applications and Infrastructure, Routing, Security, and Transport. Each area is overseen by an area director (AD), with most areas having two co-ADs. The ADs are responsible for appointing working group chairs. The area directors, together with the IETF Chair, form the Internet Engineering Steering Group (IESG), which is responsible for the overall operation of the IETF.

The Internet Architecture Board (IAB) oversees the IETF's external relationships and relations with the RFC Editor. The IAB provides long-range technical direction for Internet development. The IAB is also jointly responsible for the IETF Administrative Oversight Committee (IAOC), which oversees the IETF Administrative Support Activity (IASA), which provides logistical, etc. support for the IETF. The IAB also manages the Internet Research Task Force (IRTF), with which the IETF has a number of cross-group relations.

A Nominating Committee (NomCom) of ten randomly chosen volunteers who participate regularly at meetings is vested with the power to appoint, reappoint, and remove members of the IESG, IAB, IASA, and the IAOC. To date, no one has been removed by a NomCom, although several people have resigned their positions, requiring replacements.

In 1993 the IETF changed from an activity supported by the US Federal Government to an independent, international activity associated with the Internet Society, a US-based 501(c)(3) organization. Because the IETF itself does not have members, nor is it an organization per se, the Internet Society provides the financial and legal framework for the activities of the IETF and its sister bodies (IAB, IRTF). IETF activities are funded by meeting fees, meeting sponsors and by the Internet Society via its organizational membership and the proceeds of the Public Interest Registry.

In December 2005 the IETF Trust was established to manage the copyrighted materials produced by the IETF.

Steering group
The Internet Engineering Steering Group (IESG) is a body composed of the Internet Engineering Task Force (IETF) chair and area directors.
It provides the final technical review of Internet standards and is responsible for day-to-day management of the IETF. It receives appeals of the decisions of the working groups, and the IESG makes the decision to progress documents in the standards track.

The chair of the IESG is the director of the General Area, who also serves as the overall IETF Chair.  Members of the IESG include the two directors of each of the following areas:
 Applications Area (app)
 Internet Area (int) 
 Operations & Network Management Area (ops) 
 Routing Area (rtg) 
 Real-time Applications and Infrastructure Area (rai)
 Security Area (sec) 
 Transport and Services Area (tsv) – frequently also referred to as the "Transport Area"

Liaison and ex officio members include:
IETF Executive Director
IAB Chair
Appointed Liaison from the IAB
Liaison from the Internet Assigned Numbers Authority (IANA)
Liaison from the Request for Comments (RFC) Editor

Early leadership and administrative history 

The Gateway Algorithms and Data Structures (GADS) Task Force was the precursor to the IETF.  Its chairman was David L. Mills of the University of Delaware.

In January 1986, the Internet Activities Board (IAB; now called the Internet Architecture Board) decided to divide GADS into two entities: an Internet Architecture (INARC) Task Force chaired by Mills to pursue research goals, and the IETF to handle nearer-term engineering and technology transfer issues.  The first IETF chair was Mike Corrigan, who was then the technical program manager for the Defense Data Network (DDN).  Also in 1986, after leaving DARPA, Robert E. Kahn founded the Corporation for National Research Initiatives (CNRI), which began providing administrative support to the IETF.

In 1987, Corrigan was succeeded as IETF chair by Phill Gross.

Effective March 1, 1989, but providing support dating back to late 1988, CNRI and NSF entered into a Cooperative Agreement No. NCR-8820945, wherein CNRI agreed to create and provide a "secretariat" for the "overall coordination, management and support of the work of the IAB, its various task forces and, particularly, the IETF."

In 1992, CNRI supported the formation and early funding of the Internet Society, which took on the IETF as a fiscally sponsored project, along with the IAB, the IRTF, and the organization of annual INET meetings.  Phill Gross continued to serve as IETF chair throughout this transition.  Cerf, Kahn, and Lyman Chapin announced the formation of ISOC as "a professional society to facilitate, support, and promote the evolution and growth of the Internet as a global research communications infrastructure".  At the first board meeting of the Internet Society, Vint Cerf, representing CNRI, offered, "In the event a deficit occurs, CNRI has agreed to contribute up to USD102000 to offset it."  In 1993, Cerf continued to support the formation of ISOC while working for CNRI, and the role of ISOC in "the official procedures for creating and documenting Internet Standards" was codified in the IETF's .

In 1995, IETF's  describes ISOC's role in the IETF as being purely administrative, and ISOC as having "no influence whatsoever on the Internet Standards process, the Internet Standards or their technical content".

In 1998, CNRI established Foretec Seminars, Inc. (Foretec), a for-profit subsidiary to take over providing Secretariat services to the IETF.  Foretec provided these services until at least 2004.  By 2013, Foretec was dissolved.

In 2003, IETF's  described IETFs role in appointing 3 board members to the ISOC's board of directors.

In 2018, ISOC established The IETF Administration LLC, a separate LLC to handle the administration of the IETF.  In 2019, the LLC issued a call for proposals to provide secretariat services to the IETF.

Meetings
The first IETF meeting was attended by 21 US Federal Government-funded researchers on 16 January 1986. It was a continuation of the work of the earlier GADS Task Force. Representatives from non-governmental entities (such as gateway vendors) were invited to attend starting with the fourth IETF meeting in October 1986. Since that time all IETF meetings have been open to the public.

Initially, the IETF met quarterly, but from 1991, it has been meeting three times a year. The initial meetings were very small, with fewer than 35 people in attendance at each of the first five meetings. The maximum attendance during the first 13 meetings was only 120 attendees. This occurred at the 12th meeting held during January 1989. These meetings have grown in both participation and scope a great deal since the early 1990s; it had a maximum attendance of 2,810 at the December 2000 IETF held in San Diego, California. Attendance declined with industry restructuring during the early 2000s, and is currently around 1,200.

The location for IETF meetings vary greatly. A list of past and future meeting locations can be found on the IETF meetings page. The IETF strives to hold its meetings near where most of the IETF volunteers are located. For many years, the goal was three meetings a year, with two in North America and one in either Europe or Asia, alternating between them every other year. The current goal is to hold three meetings in North America, two in Europe and one in Asia during a two-year period. However, corporate sponsorship of the meetings is also an important factor and the schedule has been modified from time to time in order to decrease operational costs.

The IETF also organizes hackathons during the IETF meetings. The focus is on implementing code that will improve standards in terms of quality and interoperability.

Operations
The details of IETF operations have changed considerably as the organization has grown, but the basic mechanism remains publication of proposed specifications, development based on the proposals, review and independent testing by participants, and republication as a revised proposal, a draft proposal, or eventually as an Internet Standard. IETF standards are developed in an open, all-inclusive process in which any interested individual can participate. All IETF documents are freely available over the Internet and can be reproduced at will. Multiple, working, useful, interoperable implementations are the chief requirement before an IETF proposed specification can become a standard. Most specifications are focused on single protocols rather than tightly interlocked systems. This has allowed the protocols to be used in many different systems, and its standards are routinely re-used by bodies which create full-fledged architectures (e.g. 3GPP IMS).

Because it relies on volunteers and uses "rough consensus and running code" as its touchstone, results can be slow whenever the number of volunteers is either too small to make progress, or so large as to make consensus difficult, or when volunteers lack the necessary expertise. For protocols like SMTP, which is used to transport e-mail for a user community in the many hundreds of millions, there is also considerable resistance to any change that is not fully backward compatible, except for IPv6. Work within the IETF on ways to improve the speed of the standards-making process is ongoing but, because the number of volunteers with opinions on it is very great, consensus on improvements has been slow to develop.

The IETF cooperates with the W3C, ISO/IEC, ITU, and other standards bodies.

Statistics are available that show who the top contributors by RFC publication are. While the IETF only allows for participation by individuals, and not by corporations or governments, sponsorship information is available from these statistics.

Chairs
The IETF Chairperson is selected by the Nominating Committee (NomCom) process for a 2-year renewable term. Before 1993, the IETF Chair was selected by the IAB.

A list of the past and current Chairs of the IETF follows:

 Mike Corrigan (1986)
 Phill Gross (1986–1994)
 Paul Mockapetris (1994–1996)
 Fred Baker (1996–2001)
 Harald Tveit Alvestrand (2001–2005)
 Brian Carpenter (2005–2007)
 Russ Housley (2007–2013)
 Jari Arkko (2013–2017)
 Alissa Cooper (2017–2021)
 Lars Eggert (2021- )

Topics of interest
The IETF works on a broad range of networking technologies which provide foundation for the Internet's growth and evolution.

Automated network management
It aims to improve the efficiency in management of networks as they grow in size and complexity. The IETF is also standardizing protocols for autonomic networking that enables networks to be self managing.

Internet of things
It is a network of physical objects or things that are embedded with electronics, sensors, software and also enables objects to exchange data with operator, manufacturer and other connected devices. Several IETF working groups are developing protocols that are directly relevant to IoT.

New transport technology
Its development provides the ability of internet applications to send data over the Internet. There are some well-established transport protocols such as TCP (Transmission Control Protocol) and UDP (User Datagram Protocol) which are continuously getting extended and refined to meet the needs of the global Internet.

IETF areas
It divides its work into a number of areas that have Working groups that have a relation to an area's focus. Area Directors handle the primary task of area management. Area Directors may be advised by one or more Directorates. The area structure is defined by the Internet Engineering Steering Group. The Nominations Committee can be used to add new members.

Token Binding Protocol
In October 2018, Microsoft and Google engineers introduced a plan to create the Token Binding Protocol in order to stop replay attacks on OAuth tokens.

See also

Internet governance

References

External links

Steering group
IETF Online Proceedings
Early IETF Proceedings (note: large pdf files, one for each volume)
Past Meetings of the IETF
Past IESG Members and IETF Chairs
The Tao of the IETF: details on how IETF is organized

Internet properties established in 1986
Organizations established in 1986
Internet governance organizations
Internet Standard organizations
Internet-related organizations
History of the Internet
Task forces
1986 establishments in the United States